Calamba's at-large congressional district is the congressional district of the Philippines in Calamba. It has been represented in the House of Representatives of the Philippines since 2019. Previously included in Laguna's 2nd congressional district, it includes all barangays of the city. It is currently represented in the 19th Congress by Charisse Anne Hernandez of the Lakas–CMD.

Representation history

Election results

2022

2019

See also 

 Legislative district of Calamba

References

Congressional districts of the Philippines
Politics of Laguna (province)
2018 establishments in the Philippines
At-large congressional districts of the Philippines
Congressional districts of Calabarzon
Constituencies established in 2018